S. A. Shamim was a politician from the Indian state of Jammu and Kashmir. He served in the 5th Lok Sabha, and was elected as an independent from the Srinagar Lok Sabha constituency.

References

Indian Muslims
Kashmiri people
Lok Sabha members from Jammu and Kashmir
India MPs 1971–1977
Independent politicians in India
Year of birth missing
Possibly living people
Politicians from Srinagar